Pantacordis pales is a moth of the family Autostichidae. It is found in Croatia, Slovakia, Hungary and Romania.

The wingspan is 12-13.5 mm. Adults are yellowish and brown, but vary in the intensity of colouration. The forewings have a straw-yellowish ground colour with light, fawn-coloured brown scales. The hindwings are very light, almost translucent yellowish.

References

Moths described in 1954
Pantacordis
Moths of Europe